Moqaberi (also Romanized as Moqāberī and Maqāberī; also known as Moqāyerī) is a village in Jangal Rural District, in the Central District of Fasa County, Fars Province, Iran. At the time of the 2006 census, its population was 85, distributed in 19 different families.

References 

Populated places in Fasa County